Reedia may refer to:
 Reedia (fly), a genus of flies in the family Tachinidae
 Reedia (plant), a genus of plants in the family Cyperaceae
 Reedia, a fossil genus of trilobites in the family Pterygometopidae, synonym of Reedops